Pyrrhoglossum is a genus of fungus in the family Cortinariaceae. The genus is widely distributed, especially in tropical regions, and contains 11 species. It was circumscribed by American mycologist Rolf Singer in 1944.

Species
Pyrrhoglossum ferruginatum
Pyrrhoglossum hepatizon
Pyrrhoglossum holocrocinum
Pyrrhoglossum lilaceipes
Pyrrhoglossum macrosporum
Pyrrhoglossum pyrrhum
Pyrrhoglossum recedens
Pyrrhoglossum stipitatum
Pyrrhoglossum subpurpureum
Pyrrhoglossum viriditinctum
Pyrrhoglossum yunnanense

References

External links

Cortinariaceae
Agaricales genera
Taxa named by Rolf Singer